Coral Sea may refer to:
Coral Sea, a region of the north-east coast of Australia with a namesake chain of islands
Coral Sea, Queensland, a locality in the Rockhampton Region, Australia
Coral Sea Islands Territory, includes a group of small and mostly uninhabited tropical islands and reefs in the Coral Sea

Entertainment
The Coral Sea (book), by Patti Smith
The Coral Sea (album), live album by Patti Smith and Kevin Shields
The Coral Sea (band), a Santa Barbara, California based Art Rock band led by Rey Villalobos
The Coral Island, a book by R. M. Ballantyne

Events
Battle of the Coral Sea (1942), fought between the US and Japan, the first fleet action in which aircraft carriers engaged each other
Coral Sea order of battle, list of units that participated in the battle
Coral Sea (wargame), a 1974 board wargame that simulates the Battle of the Coral Sea

Science and technology
Coral sea gregory, a damselfish of the family Pomacentridae, found on coral and rocky reefs in the western Pacific Ocean
, disambiguation; United States Navy ships named for the Battle of the Coral Sea
USS Coral Sea (CVE-57), a  later renamed USS Anzio
, a